Pass It On may refer to:

Music
 Pass It On (Bryn Haworth album), 1984
 Pass It On (Dave Holland album), 2008
 Pass It On (Douwe Bob album), 2015
 "Pass It On" (song), a 2003 song by The Coral

Other
 Pass It On (play), a play by New Zealand playwright Renée
 Pass It On, an advertising campaign by The Foundation for a Better Life
 Pass It On, play by Doug Lucie